Woltersdorf is a municipality in the Oder-Spree district in Brandenburg. It is often referred to as "near Berlin" (German: "bei Berlin") or "near Erkner" (German: "bei Erkner") as there are a number of other places bearing the same name in Germany.

Geography
The municipality is located at the three lakes Flakensee, Kalksee and the Bauernsee, between Schöneiche, the Berlin forest and Erkner.

Bordering municipalities
Woltersdorf borders (in clockwise direction, starting in north) on Rüdersdorf, Erkner, Berlin and Schöneiche.

History
Around 1240 14 farmer families settled on a bank. Today the church, the city hall and the "old school" (German "alte Schule") are located here, representing the Woltersdorf "downtown". The first residents were farmers and mariners. In 1319 Woltersdorf was first documented as Waltersdorf slawika. Waltersdorf means "the village from Walter".
In 1375 Woltersdorf was first noted in the "Landbuch". Together with Rahnsdorf, it paid taxes for the castle of Köpenick.

In 1487 Berlin acquired Woltersdorf. Then in 1550 a lock was built between the Flakensee and the Kalksee, the same year the first church of Woltersdorf was built. Between 1618 till 1648 Woltesdorf was desolated (Thirty Years' War) and temporarily uninhabited. About 1886 a touristic observation tower is built on top of the Kranichsberge. It granted a great perspective from a height of 105 meters, and on clear days you were able to see the Berliner Fernsehturm. Inside the tower today is an exhibition "When Woltersdorf still was Hollywood" (German "Als Woltersdorf noch Hollywood war"). It recalls the 1920s, where Joe May shot famous movies (Das indische Grabmal (1920), Herrin der Welt (1919) and Der Tiger von Eschnapur). Today you are able to find remains of the movie scenery on site.

At the end of the 19th century the rail from Berlin to the east was finished. In the bordering commune of Woltersdorf, Erkner, a train station was built. Many Berlin people had their summer residence in Woltersdorf. Since 1913 a tramway has run between the lock and the S-Bahn station of Rahnsdorf.

Demography 
At the time of the German reunification, 4,790 people lived in Woltersdorf. Since then, the population of Woltersdorf has risen from 6,800 (2001) to nearly 8,000 (2010). Today, Woltersdorf is the youngest commune in the Oder-Spree district. More than 12% of the population is younger than 15 years of age.

Politics
The City Council has 18 members, one however has not accepted his seat which remains vacant.
 CDU: 4
 SPD: 3
 Linkspartei: 4
 Grüne: 1
 FDP: 1
 WBF (Woltersdorf Citizens' Forum): 3
 NPD: 1
(Election 2008)

Elections 2014
 Unser Woltersdorf (UW): 5 (+5)
 Woltersdorfer Bürgerforum (WBF): 4 (+1)
 The Left: 3 (-1)
 CDU: 2 (-2)
 SPD: 1 (-2)
 FDP: 1 
 Greens: 1 
 Single candidate Siegfried Bronsert: 1

Famous Persons
 Politician (SPD) and biologist Regine Hildebrandt (1941–2001)
 Painter and Illustrator Fidus (1868–1948)
 Footballer Bodo Rudwaleit (born 1957)
 Entertainer Dagmar Frederic (born 1945)
 Founder of the Wilhelmsbad Woltersdorf, Dr.med. Alfred Pritzel
 Musician Chris Corner (founding member and former lead singer of Sneaker Pimps, currently involved in the IAMX project) (born 1974)
 Architect Friedrich Heinrich Stöckhardt (1842–1920)

References

External links

  
 tram in Woltersdorf

Localities in Oder-Spree